Punctelia is a genus of foliose lichens belonging to the large family Parmeliaceae. The genus, which contains about 50 species, was segregated from genus Parmelia in 1982. Characteristics that define Punctelia include the presence of hook-like to thread-like conidia (asexual spores), simple rhizines (root-like structures that attach the lichen thallus to its substrate), and point-like pseudocyphellae (tiny pores on the thallus surface that facilitate gas exchange). It is this last feature that is alluded to in the vernacular names speckled shield lichens or speckleback lichens.

Punctelia lichens grow on bark, wood, and rocks. The genus is cosmopolitan, occurring on all continents but Antarctica. Species are found in temperate to subtropical locations. Punctelia has centres of distribution in the Neotropics and Africa; about half of the known species occur in South America. The photobiont partners of Punctelia are green algae in the genus Trebouxia. Some Punctelia species have been proposed for use as bioindicators of air pollution.

Systematics

The genus was circumscribed by Norwegian lichenologist Hildur Krog in 1982. The genus originally contained 22 species segregated from Parmelia based on differences in the development of the  pseudocyphellae, secondary chemistry, and phytogeography. The earliest-published member of this group, Parmelia borreri, was assigned as the type species of the genus. This cosmopolitan lichen was first described by James Edward Smith in 1807, followed independently a year later by Dawson Turner.

Before Krog's publication, the Parmelia species with point-like pseudocyphellae were referred to as the Parmelia borreri group, and categorized in Parmelia subgenus Parmelia, section Parmelia, subsection Simplices.  Krog divided Punctelia into two subgenera: Punctelia subgenus Punctelia, characterized by hook-shaped (unciform) spermatia and atranorin as a major cortical substance, and Punctelia subgenus Flavopunctelia characterized by bifusiform spermatia and usnic acid as a major cortical substance. Based on differences in spermatia shape as well as additional chemical characters, Flavopunctelia was later recognized by Mason Hale as a separate genus consisting of four species. A preliminary molecular phylogenetic analysis of these two genera, published in 2005, corroborated their segregation from Parmelia, and confirmed the genus delimitations.

In North America, member of the genus are commonly known as "speckled shield lichens" or "speckleback lichens". The genus name also refers to the pseudocyphellae: it is derived from the Latin punctum, meaning "small spot" or "dot".

Phylogenetics

Punctelia is a member of the large lichen family Parmeliaceae. In 2017, Divakar and colleagues used a then-recently developed "temporal phylogenetic" approach to identify temporal bands for specific taxonomic ranks in the family Parmeliaceae, suggesting that groups of species that diverged within the time window of 29.45–32.55 million years ago represent genera. They proposed to synonymize the lichenicolous genus Nesolechia with Punctelia (its lichen-forming sister group), because the former group of species originated relatively recently and fell under the timeframe threshold for genus level. This synonymy was not accepted in a review published soon afterwards. Although the authors acknowledge that Nesolechia is a member of the Parmeliaceae, and represents a morphologically reduced member of Punctelia, they suggest that "since the parasitic genera appear as sister groups ... synonymization feels hardly necessary". In later critical analysis of the temporal phylogenetic approach by Robert Lücking, he also rejected the proposed synonymy, explaining "if taxonomy and classification are to reflect evolutionary history, then merging them into a single genus just because of the point in time they diverged is certainly not justified".

Molecular phylogenetic analysis has been used to more accurate delimit Punctelia species and identify previously undetected cryptic species, a research trend that has become common in the family Parmeliaceae, where dozens of cryptic species have been identified. In the case of Punctelia, P. rudecta was thought until recently to have an expansive global distribution, with a range including North and South America, Africa, and Asia. Phylogenetic analysis revealed a species complex that has subsequently been split into four distinct cryptic lineages with more restricted distributional ranges; the range of P. rudecta has been reduced to North America. This research also revealed that there are five major clades in  Punctelia, and each clade has characteristic patterns in medullary chemistry. Clades A, B, and C have species with lecanoric acid, clade D has species with gyrophoric acid as the main compound, while clade E has two species that have fatty acids as the main secondary chemical.

Description

Punctelia lichens are medium-sized, foliose (leafy), and grey to greyish-green, although collected specimens gradually lose their colour tone. The lobes that comprise the thallus are typically 3–10 mm across. The medulla is white, while the lower surface ranges from pale to black. Simple, unbranched rhizines are present that extend to the edge of the lobe; they are usually more or less the same colour as the thallus underside, although individuals with light rhizines on a dark background are not unusual.

A major characteristic of Punctelia is the presence of point-like (punctate) pseudocyphellae on the surface of the thallus. These are tiny pores that facilitate gas exchange. In the genus Parmelia, pseudocyphellae  are straight and without a distinct form, and typically situated on the thallus surface (laminal) and/or on the margins (marginal). In comparison, Punctelia pseudocyphellae are rounded (orbicular) and laminal, although in some species the cortex gets pushed around the edges of the thallus, giving them a marginal appearance. Electron microscopy of Parmelia pseudocyphellae reveals a perforated polysaccharide layer; this layer is absent in Punctelia. Pseudocyphellae are termed conspicuous when then can be viewed with the naked eye, inconspicuous when a hand lens or microscope is needed to see them, and subtle for intermediate states where they can be seen only with concerted effort.

The apothecia (sexual reproductive structures) are lecanorine, with brown discs. Ascospores are colourless, ellipsoid, and number eight per ascus; they range in size from 10–27 to 6–18 μm. The unciform (hook-like) shape of the conidia is another major characteristic of genus Punctelia. They are short rods measuring 4–7 μm long with one end curved. Although not all Punctelia species have unciform conidia, this conidial shape only occurs in Punctelia. Some species have filiform (threadlike) conidia that are in the size range 7–12 μm long by 0.8–1 μm wide. The size and shape of the conidia is an important character in some instances; for example, P. graminicola and  P.  hypoleucites are morphologically indistinguishable from each other, and they can only be reliably identified by differences in their conidia.  Cell walls of Punctelia lichens contain the alpha glucan polysaccharide isolichenan.

Other Parmeliaceae genera that are superficially similar to Punctelia and have pseudocyphellae are Flavopunctelia and Cetrelia. Flavopunctelia species tend to be yellower than Punctelia due to the presence of usnic acid in the cortex.

Secondary chemicals found in the genus include atranorin in the cortex, and gyrophoric acid in the medulla. Lecanoric acid has been detected as a minor component in Punctelia jujensis and P. subrudecta.

Photobiont
Most lichen genera associate with a photobiont partner from one algal genus. Punctelia is no exception to this general rule; it associates with species from the most common photobiont genus, Trebouxia. In a study of photobiont partner selectivity, Punctelia subrudecta specimens collected from central Europe were shown to have a moderate selectivity, associating with three species of Trebouxia: T. jamesii, T. arboricola, and T. gelatinosa (the latter most frequently). The photobiont partner for P. rudecta is Trebouxia anticipata.

Habitat and distribution
Punctelia lichens are generally found on bark, wood, and rocks. However, P. constantimontium and P. subpraesignis have been recorded utilising cement mortar as a growing surface in Verónica, Buenos Aires. In the biodiverse cerrado forests of Brazil, they are more or less limited to well-lit microhabitats  without direct sunlight. They have a temperate to subtropical distribution with centers of distribution in the Neotropics and Africa. Rarely does the geographical range of Punctelia species extend to boreal and cold mountainous areas; an exception is Punctelia stictica, which has been recorded in Greenland. Collectively, the genus has a cosmopolitan distribution, occurring on all continents, with the exception of Antarctica. Only a few species are known to occur in Asia and Australia; in contrast, most Parmelia species occur in these regions. Five species are known from Australia, including two cosmopolitan species and three endemic Australasian species. Sixteen Punctelia species occur in the continental United States and Canada. About half of the known Punctelia species are found in Brazil. Revised accounts of the genus have been published for several European countries in recent decades, including Norway (2000), Switzerland (2003), Denmark (2007), Lithuania (2010), and Poland. Seven species occur in Europe.

Conservation
, only a single species of Punctelia has been assessed for the global IUCN Red List. Because it has an abundant and widespread population in North America with no sign of decline, Punctelia caseana is considered a species of least concern.

Species

A recent (2020) estimate places 48 species in the genus Punctelia. , Species Fungorum accepts 30 species of Punctelia.
Punctelia appalachensis  – United States
Punctelia bolliana  – North America
Punctelia borreri  – cosmopolitan
Punctelia borrerina  – South America; Mexico
Punctelia canaliculata 
Punctelia caseana  – eastern United States
Punctelia cedrosensis  – Baja California; northern Mexico
Punctelia colombiana  – South America
Punctelia constantimontium  – Africa; South America; Mexico
Punctelia crispa  – Brazil
Punctelia diffractaica  – Peru
Punctelia digitata  – Brazil
Punctelia eganii  – Alabama
Punctelia fimbriata  – Brazil
Punctelia graminicola  – North America
Punctelia guanchica  – Canary Islands
Punctelia hypoleucites  – Africa; North America; South America
Punctelia imbricata  – Brazil
Punctelia involuta  – Brazil
Punctelia jeckeri 
Punctelia jujensis  – South America
Punctelia microsticta 
Punctelia missouriensis  – United States
Punctelia nashii  – California
Punctelia nebulata  – Australia
Punctelia negata  – South America
Punctelia neutralis 
Punctelia novozelandica  – New Zealand
Punctelia osorioi  – Brazil
Punctelia perreticulata  – Europe; North America; South America; Australia; New Zealand
Punctelia pseudocoralloidea  – Australia
Punctelia punctilla  – Africa; South America; North America
Punctelia purpurascens  – Brazil
Punctelia reddenda  – Africa; Europe; North America; South America
Punctelia riograndensis  – Africa; South America
Punctelia roseola  – Brazil
Punctelia rudecta  – North America
Punctelia ruderata  – Asia and East Africa
Punctelia stictica  – Africa; Europe; North America; South America; Greenland
Punctelia subalbicans  – Australia; New Zealand
Punctelia subflava 
Punctelia subpraesignis  – South Africa; South America; Mexico
Punctelia subrudecta  – cosmopolitan
Punctelia tomentosula  – Peru
Punctelia toxodes  – South Africa
Punctelia transtasmanica  – Tasmania, New Zealand
Punctelia ulophylla  – Europe

The species Punctelia pallescens, described by Syo Kurokawa in 1999 as a new species from western Australia, is considered synonymous with P. subalbicans. Parmelia helenae, described by Maurice Bouly de Lesdain in 1937 and transferred to Punctelia in 1998, was considered by some lichenologists to be a questionable taxon because, according to Teuvo Ahti, "the type material is insufficient to resolve its taxonomic relationship with Punctelia perrituculata ... and P. subrudecta ... on the basis of conidial characters". It is now placed in synonymy with P. subrudecta. Punctelia semansiana  is the same species as Punctelia graminicola.

Parasites
Many species of lichenicolous fungi have been recorded using Punctelia as a host. These include: Abrothallus parmeliarum, Didymocyrtis melanelixiae, Epithamnolia xanthoriae, Lichenoconium usneae, Llimoniella bergeriana, Lichenohendersonia uniseptata, Nesolechia oxyspora, Pronectria oligospora, Pyrenidium sp., Rinodina conradii, Sphaerellothecium reticulatum, Tremella parmeliarum, Trichosphaerella buckii, and Xenonectriella subimperspicua. One of these fungal parasites—Xenophoma puncteliae—is named after its host's genus.

Human uses

Biomonitoring
Some members of Punctelia have been shown to be somewhat sensitive to air pollution. A study conducted in Spain observed Punctelia borreri and P. subrudecta reappearing in areas with a decline in SO2 pollution. Two Punctelia species have been recommended for use as element bioindicators in air pollution monitoring studies in the eastern United States. Punctelia rudecta is suggested for use in cooler forested uplands, and P. missouriensis for use in isolated woodlands or urban areas. Because of the widespread occurrence of P. hypoleucites in both urban and industrial sites in and around Tandil, Argentina, it has been proposed as a potential biomonitor of air pollution in that city.

Traditional medicine
Punctelia borreri has been used in traditional Chinese medicine as an alleged remedy for a variety of ailments, including chronic dermatitis, blurred vision, bleeding from the uterus or from external injuries, and for sores and swelling. To use, a decoction was drunk, or the dried and powdered lichen applied directly to the affected area.

Dyeing
Punctelia rudecta can be used to create a dye by a color-extraction with ammonia as a solvent. A pink color is obtained using this method.

References

Lecanorales genera
Lichen genera
Taxa named by Hildur Krog
Taxa described in 1982